This is a list of United Nations Security Council Resolutions 2301 to 2400 adopted between 26 July 2016 and 8 February 2018.

See also 
 Lists of United Nations Security Council resolutions
 List of United Nations Security Council Resolutions 2201 to 2300
 List of United Nations Security Council Resolutions 2401 to 2500

2301